Patrick Ronald Cooney (March 10, 1934 – October 15, 2012) was an American prelate of the Roman Catholic Church. He was the third Bishop of Gaylord and held the title Bishop Emeritus in that diocese.

Early life
Patrick Cooney was born in Detroit, Michigan, to Michael and Elizabeth (née Dowdall) Cooney. The oldest of four children, he has two sisters, Mary, now deceased, (a retired teacher of the Detroit Public School System) and Leontia (an Adrian Dominican nun), and one brother, Michael (a priest of the Archdiocese of Detroit).

Cooney attended St. Edward Elementary School from 1940 to 1948, and Sacred Heart Seminary High School from 1948 to 1952. He then studied at Sacred Heart Major Seminary, from where he obtained a Bachelor's degree in Philosophy in 1956. He then furthered his studies in Rome at the Pontifical Gregorian University, earning a Bachelor's in Sacred Theology in 1958.

Priesthood
While in Rome, Cooney was ordained to the priesthood by Bishop Martin J. O'Connor on December 20, 1959. He later obtained a Licentiate in Sacred Theology from the Gregorian in 1960. Upon his return to the United States, he served as an assistant pastor at St. Catherine Church in Detroit (1960–1962), assistant chancellor of the Archdiocese (1962–1969), and chaplain at Mercy College (1967–1972).

From 1969 to 1983, Cooney was director of the Archdiocesan Department of Worship. He also pursued his graduate work at the University of Notre Dame in Indiana, and there earned a Master of Arts degree in liturgical research in 1973. He was named, in addition to his role as Director of Worship, rector of the Cathedral of the Most Blessed Sacrament in 1977.

Episcopal career

Auxiliary Bishop of Detroit
On December 3, 1982, Cooney was appointed Auxiliary Bishop of Detroit and Titular Bishop of Hodelm by Pope John Paul II. He received his episcopal consecration on January 27, 1983 from Archbishop Edmund Szoka, with Bishops Harold Perry, S.V.D., and Arthur Krawczak serving as co-consecrators, at the Cathedral of the Most Blessed Sacrament.

In addition to his duties as an auxiliary bishop, Cooney was the founding chairman of the Archdiocese's Church in the City Task Force from 1983 to 1990. He also served as liaison to the Catholic Chaplains of Region VI (Michigan and Ohio) from 1987 to 1991, and a member of Board of Directors for Notre Dame Liturgical Center (1987–1991) and for the Pontifical North American College (1988–1994).

Bishop of Gaylord
Cooney was later named the third Bishop of Gaylord on November 6, 1989. He succeeded Robert John Rose (who was appointed Bishop of Grand Rapids in January 1989), and was formally installed as Bishop on January 28, 1990. During his tenure, he issued three pastoral letters: An Agenda for the Church in Gaylord (1991), The Sequence for the Celebration of the Sacarments of Initiation of Children in the Diocese of Gaylord (2001), and Catechesis: The Primary Goal of the Church (2006).

In 2002, Cooney allowed Rev. Gerald Shirilla to serve as pastor of a church with a school, despite knowing that Shirilla had been removed from the Archdiocese of Detroit in 1993 following decades-long allegations of sexual abuse. After the Detroit Free Press reported on the situation in 2003, he said that Shirilla had made "some errors in judgment" but was "no threat to the well-being of our children," only to suspend him two weeks later.

On January 5, 2008, Cooney suffered a heart attack while preparing for an ordination ceremony. He then underwent quadruple bypass surgery at Munson Medical Center.

Within the United States Conference of Catholic Bishops, Cooney was a member of the Committee on Liturgy (1984–1996), Subcommittee of Bishops and Scholars (1988–1992), and National Advisory Council (1995–1998); and chairman of the Subcommittee on Use of Exclusive Language in Liturgy (1989–1991), Subcommittee on Book of Blessings (1989–1991), and Subcommittee on Cremation and Other Funeral Questions (1989–1993). He also co-chaired the Roman Catholic-Reformed Church Dialogue Committee from 1998 to 2001. From 1993 to 1998, Cooney was a board member of the National Institute for the Word of God and of Sacred Heart Major Seminary. In 2004, he became a board member of the Catholic Relief Services.

Cooney died on October 15, 2012.

References

1934 births
2012 deaths
Clergy from Detroit
20th-century Roman Catholic bishops in the United States
21st-century Roman Catholic bishops in the United States
Sacred Heart Major Seminary alumni
Roman Catholic bishops of Gaylord
Roman Catholic Archdiocese of Detroit